Kevin Mack is an American football player.

Kevin Mack may also refer to:

Kevin Mack (visual effects artist) (born 1959), also known as Kevin Scott Mack
Kevin Mack of Toquaht First Nation